The House of Clary und Aldringen, also known as Clary-Aldringen, is one of the most prominent Austro-Hungarian princely families. Originally from Friuli, Northern Italy, one branch of the family moved to the County of Tyrol around 1500 and to the Kingdom of Bohemia around 1600, where it became one of the leading families of the Bohemian nobility. It produced several notable Austro-Hungarian statesmen, military officers and diplomats.

Origin
The Clario de Riva family were lords of Riva del Garda. One brother moved to the neighboring County of Tyrol around 1500, in the service of Emperor Maximilian I, the other brother sided with the emperor's enemy, the Republic of Venice, and remained in the Friuli province where his descendants later extinguished.

Franz von Clary moved from Tyrol to the Kingdom of Bohemia and acquired the Dobříčany estates at Liběšice in 1622/23, a property confiscated from protestants that were banned from Bohemia. Some Tyrolian possessions also remained in the family. His son Hieronymus von Clary married Countess Anna Maria von Aldringen, sister and heiress of the Thirty Years War's Austrian general count Johann von Aldringen, in 1622. Their descendants were allowed by imperial decree to adopt the name and arms of both families. Ever since, the family has been known as Clary und Aldringen (or Clary-Aldringen).

History
The princes of Clary und Aldringen have been one of the most prominent families of the Austrian Empire and the Kingdom of Bohemia.

The rise of the family started when Franz von Clary left his ancestral lands in Tyrol to settle in the Kingdom of Bohemia. In 1623, Clary bought properties in the Ústí nad Labem region. However, it was the inheritance of Johann von Aldringen's estates through Franz's son's wife, Anna Maria von Aldringen, that made the Clary-Aldringens one of the most influential and wealthy Bohemian noble families. The Aldringens were a catholic noble family from the Spanish Netherlands. In 1634, Johann von Aldringen had received from Emperor Ferdinand II the ownership of lands in and around the wealthy city of Teplitz (Teplice), shortly before confiscated from the protestant count Vilém Kinský who had been assassinated together with Wallenstein, with Aldringen being one of the plotters of this murder. However, Aldringen died in a battle the same year, without issue. After some inheritance quarrels among his siblings, Emperor Ferdinand II recognized his sister Anna Maria as heiress of the Teplice estates. Since then, the Clary-Aldringens were the most powerful nobles of the Sudetes, the German speaking northern parts of Bohemia. Consequently, the rise of the family sped up and, in 1666, the Clary-Aldringens were raised to the rank of Count of the Holy Roman Empire by Emperor Joseph I.

In 1767, Reichsgraf Wenzel von Clary und Aldringen, the Imperial Treasurer (and Emperor Joseph II's private council member), was raised to princely rank. Members of the family became hereditary members of the Austrian Reichsrat (Imperial Council). From that date, the princely title of Fürst (Prince) von Clary und Aldringen was borne by the head of the family, who was styled as Durchlaucht (Serene Highness). Junior members bore the title of Graf (Count) or Gräfin (Countess) von Clary und Aldringen and were styled as Erlaucht (Illustrious Highness).

During the Napoleonic Wars, the family's Teplitz castle was the headquarters of the Sixth Coalition against Napoleon, uniting the monarchs of Austria, Prussia and Russia. There was first signed the triple alliance against Napoleon I that led to the coalition victory at the nearby Battle of Kulm and eventually instated the Holy Alliance, officially signed in Paris on September 26, 1815.

In 1832, two sisters of Prince Edmund (1813–1894) married into the Radziwiłł family, Mathilde (1806–1896) married Prince Wilhelm Radziwiłł (1797-1870), a son of Louise of Prussia, while her younger sister Leontine (1811-1890) married Wilhelm's younger brother, Prince Bogusław Fryderyk Radziwiłł. During the 19th century, the family hosted royalty several times at their Teplitz castle: in 1835, they received King Frederick William III of Prussia, Emperor Nicholas I of Russia and Emperor Franz I of Austria, hosting a ceremony in memory of the treaty of the Sixth Coalition; in 1849, they received Emperor Franz Joseph of Austria and Kings Frederick William IV of Prussia and Frederick-August II of Saxony; in 1860, they received Emperor Franz Joseph of Austria and the Prince-Regent William of Prussia.

During the late 19th century, the princely family maintained great influence within the Austrian nobility. It thus played an important role in politics and diplomacy, as illustrated by the two younger brothers of Prince Carlos (1844–1920), Austro-Hungarian diplomat Prince Siegfried (1848–1929) and his brother, the Minister-President of Austria Count Manfred (1852–1928).

Siegfried's son Alfons (1887–1978) became the seventh prince, and took over the management of the family estate in 1920, after the Kingdom of Bohemia had become part of the First Czechoslovak Republic. He lost several thousand hectares in a land-reform, but redeveloped the family enterprises, including a brewery, spa resorts, restaurants, a coal mine, two sawmills, brickworks, lime works and a woodworking factory. However he lost his Bohemian ancestral estates through communist confiscation in 1945. Following the expulsion of Germans from Czechoslovakia, the family has since lived in Frankfurt, Germany, and in Venice, Italy. Since March 2007, the head of the family is Hieronymus, 9th Prince of Clary und Aldringen (born 1944).

Notable members
 Reichsgraf Johann von Aldringen (1584–1634), commandant of the Austrian army during the Thirty Years War
 Prince Wenzel von Clary und Aldringen, first Prince of Clary und Aldringen
 Princess Elizabeth-Alexandrine von Clary und Aldringen, née Countess de Ficquelmont, daughter of Count Charles-Louis and Countess Dorothea de Ficquelmont, née Tiesenhausen
 Prince Siegfried von Clary-Aldringen (1848–1929), prominent Austro-Hungarian diplomat, son of the above
 Count Manfred von Clary-Aldringen (1852–1928), Austro-Hungarian statesman, Governor of the Austrian imperial lands of Silesia and Styria, minister-president of the Austrian part of the Empire (1889), and brother of the above

Residences
The Clary-Aldringens were great landowners, therefore they possessed enormous estates in Bohemia, Tyrol and Lower Austria.

The most important of all of their estates was that of Tepliz, which comprised the eponymous city as well as more than 70 towns and villages. It was one of the largest noble estates of the Sudetes and one of the largest private properties of Bohemia before its confiscation according to the Beneš decrees.

In consequence, the Clary-Aldringens had many residences, the grandest being:
 Schloss Teplice (Teplice Palace), the primary seat of the family from the 16th century until its confiscation in 1945;
 Palais Mollard-Clary, the family palace in Vienna (sold in 1922);
 Palazzo Clary in Venice, to this day owned by the present prince;
 Schloss Herrnau (Herrnau Castle) in Salzburg, to this day owned by a younger branch of the counts of Clary-Aldringen.

Dubí's St-Mary's Church was built on the order of the Clary-Aldringens between 1898 and 1906 as a copy of the Venice church Santa Maria dell'Orto, to become their new family church.

Marriages
The Clary und Aldringen family is related by marriage to many other prominent families, including the following: Radziwill, Glam Gallas, Mensdorff-Pouilly, Ficquelmont, Pejácsevich, de Baillet-Latour, Kinsky, Eltz, Donnersmarck, and Hohenzollern[-Hechingen].

Bibliography
 Alfons Clary-Aldringen, Memoirs: „Geschichten eines alten Österreichers“ (History of an old Austrian), Ullstein publishers, Frankfurt 1977, 
 Diana Mosley, Prince and Princess Clary. Loved Ones, London 1985, pp. 132–153,

References